Eden-Bombala was an electoral district of the Legislative Assembly in the Australian state of New South Wales from 1894 to 1904, including the town of Eden. In 1894, single-member electorates were introduced statewide and the seat of Eden was split into Eden-Bombala (including Bombala) and Bega. In 1904 Eden-Bombala was abolished as a result of the 1903 New South Wales referendum which reduced the number of members of the Legislative Assembly from 125 to 90 and the district was absorbed into Monaro and Bega. Its sole member was William Wood.

Members for Eden-Bombala

Election results

References

Electoral districts of New South Wales
1894 establishments in Australia
Constituencies established in 1894
1904 disestablishments in Australia
Constituencies disestablished in 1904